Steven Welsh (born 16 March 1974) is a Canadian cricket player. He is a right-handed batsman and a right arm medium-fast bowler. He made his debut for Canada in the ICC Americas Championship One Day International against Bermuda on 21 August 2006 and went on to play in the remainder of the matches in the tournament.

He was strangely left out of the Canadian 2007 World Cup squad despite some impressive performances leading up to the tournament. He currently plays club cricket for Meraloma Athletic Club in Vancouver, BC, Canada.

References

External links

Living people
1974 births
Canada One Day International cricketers
Canada Twenty20 International cricketers